Parliamentary elections were held in Bolivia in December 1920 to elect a new National Congress. They followed the coup d'état that prevented the Congress elected in May 1920 from taking office.

Results

Elected Senators
Antonio L. Velasco, PR (Béni)
Maximiano Arce, PR (Béni)
Domingo L. Ramírez, PR (Chuquisaca)
Román Paz, PR (Chuquisaca)
José Q. Mdendoza, PR (Cochabamba)
Carlos Salamanca, PR (Cochabamba)
Francisco Iraizós, PR (La Paz)
Abel Iturralde, PR (La Paz)
León M. Loza, PR (Oruro)
Daniel Salamanca, PR (Oruro)
José Paravicini, PR (Potosi)
Severo Fernández Alonso, PR (Potosí)
Ignacio Justiniano, PR (Santa Cruz)
Pablo E. Roca, PR (Santa Cruz)
Julio Lema, PR (Tarija)
José R. Estenssoro, PR (Tarija)

Aftermath
On 24 January 1921 the National Congress elected Bautista Saavedra President of the Republic. On 31 January Congress elected Luis Paz Vice-President.

References

1920 12
Bolivia
Legislative election
1920